Meteorology was first practiced in Serbia when meteorological data was gathered, monitored and recorded on a daily basis, in 1848,  in Belgrade. Daily, meteorological forecasts started in 1892. The first meteorologist was Vladimir Jakšić. 

While the first meteorological observation post was in a nearby private house, a meteorological observation station (Serbian Meteorološka opservatorija) building was built in 1891 by architect Dimitrije T. Leko, on Vračar's plateau, in Savinac  (recognized also as Englezovac, named after Francis Mackenzie).

External links

 Belgrade Meteorological Station 

Buildings and structures completed in 1891
Meteorological stations
Buildings and structures in Belgrade
Science and technology in Serbia